Sri Krishna Leela is a 1977 Tamil-language Hindu mythological film, written and directed by A. P. Nagarajan. The film was produced by R. M. Subramaniam, with music from S. V. Venkatraman. Sivakumar starred in the titular role with Jayalalitha, Srividya, Nagesh, R. S. Manohar taking supporting roles. This also marked Jayalalithaa's last film during the 70s era.

Cast 

 Sivakumar as Lord Vishu/Lord Krishna
 T. R. Mahalingam as Naratha Muni
 Srividya as Rukmani
 Jayalalitha as Sathyabhama
 R. S. Manohar as Kamsan
 C. R. Vijayakumari as Devaki (Lord Krishna Mother)
 Major Sundararajan as Vasudevan (Lord Krishna Father)
 V. S. Raghavan as Ugrasenan
 Nagesh as Balu
 S. Varalakshmi as Yasothai
 Suruli Rajan as Kamsan's Henchman (1)
 Typist Gopu as Kamsan's Henchman (2)
 Ennatha Kannaiya as Kamsan's Henchman (3)
 S. Rama Rao
 Manorama
 Sachu
 Gandhimathi
 A. Sakunthala as Kamsan's Palace Dancer
Shanmugasundari
 V. R. Thilagam
 "Achcho" Chithra
 Peeli Sivam
 Siththan
 Thangaraj
 Shanthi Kumar
 Vasntha Kumar
 Rajavelu
 Master Krishnan as Little Balaraman

Soundtrack 
Music was by S. V. Venkatraman and lyrics were written by Kannadasan, K. D. Santhanam, Poovai Senkuttuvan and Ra. Pazhanisamy

References

External links 
 

1977 films
1970s Tamil-language films
Films about Krishna
Films about reincarnation
Films about royalty
Films about shapeshifting
Films based on the Mahabharata
Films directed by A. P. Nagarajan
Films scored by S. V. Venkatraman
Films set in 1977
Films with screenplays by A. P. Nagarajan
Hindu devotional films
Indian musical films
Indian nonlinear narrative films
Religious epic films
1970s musical films